Lansky is a 1999 American made-for-television crime drama film written by David Mamet and directed by John McNaughton and starring Richard Dreyfuss as the famous gangster Meyer Lansky, Eric Roberts as Bugsy Siegel, and Ryan Merriman as the young Lansky.

Plot
The movie starts with flashbacks of Lansky's life, first showing an elderly Lansky looking for a rock to put on his grandfather's grave in Jerusalem. Upon seeing soldiers of the Israeli Defense Force, Lansky expresses regret that his grandfather never lived to see them. As he walks through a tunnel, he catches sight of an old man. He recalls how at the age of ten, he witnessed an elderly Jew being bludgeoned to death with an axe during a pogrom. Another flashback shows Lansky and his family fleeing as their shtetl is burned to the ground, his parents hastily packing up their valuables and preparing to immigrate to America. Lansky's grandfather watches skeptically and refuses to leave, believing it to be an act of cowardice not to fight back. His son, Lansky's father, replies with "You think I should fight? You stay, and you fight."

The setting then moves forward several years later to the Lower East Side of New York. After his mother gives him money to go buy challah for Shabbat, Lansky comes upon a game of craps on the street corner. He returns home, penniless and ashamed, to face a brutal reprimand from his parents for betraying their trust.

Later, Lansky and his friend Benjamin Siegel are shown eyeing the Irish-American boy who operates the craps game. Lansky makes a bet, but then sees the operator's friend sliding him another set of dice as he throws his. Certain that the game is rigged, Lansky shouts that he has won the bet. The operator shoves him, Lansky shoves him back, and then the operator's friend pulls out a knife and cuts his arm. Siegel suddenly arrives and hits the knife-wielding kid with a brick, shouting at him to hand over the money. As Lansky and Siegel are walking down to the docks, they see the Irish kid who bet against them; the kid sees them and starts yelling antisemitic Irish slurs. Lansky tackles him into the water and slits the Irish kid's neck.

As blood is sliding around in the water, the film returns to the elderly Lansky, drinking wine with the Jewish man he saw earlier. The Jewish man goes to pray in the synagogue as the film transitions to a younger Lansky now running his own craps games. Lansky goes into an alley to count his money, where he meets teenage hoodlum Charles "Lucky" Luciano. When Luciano tells him that he needs to pay protection for running games in his neighborhood, Lansky refuses and receives a severe beating from Luciano's gang. Nevertheless, he refuses to pay up.

Luciano takes a liking to Lansky's guts and recruits him and Siegel into his gang. By the early 1920s, Luciano and his boys have become involved with the bootlegging of illegal alcohol. Siegel, Luciano, and Lansky are shown driving one of their trucks loaded with alcohol when they are suddenly ambushed by associates of wealthy Jewish gangster Arnold Rothstein. Luciano and Lansky cut a deal to hand over a truckload of their liquor to Rothstein to avoid being killed, but by the time they've made their escape, Rothstein's men realize the "shipment" is nothing more than a bunch of empty suitcases. Impressed, Rothstein invites the gang to his house for a sit-down. He offers Siegel and Lansky jobs in his organization, recognizing their talent.

After Rothstein is murdered in 1928, Lansky and Siegel work with Luciano, now a powerful gangster in his own right, to take over New York's criminal underworld by assassinating Mafia bosses Joe Masseria and Salvatore Maranzano. Luciano takes control of Masseria and Maranzano's gangs and establishes the Commission, declaring that the Five Families can now work freely with the Jewish and Irish mobs. Lansky builds up his prestige by opening and running several highly profitable casinos in Cuba and helping Siegel get a start in Las Vegas. After Siegel overspends on his own casinos and his girlfriend Virginia Hill is suspected of stealing money, Meyer uses his influence to buy his childhood friend time to turn the venture around.

A month after warning Siegel that the Flamingo is not earning enough of a profit, Lansky can no longer prevent the Commission from taking out Siegel, and reluctantly approves a hit on his friend. Years later, Lansky, now facing federal charges of tax evasion, flees to Israel and tries to settle there by exploiting his Jewish heritage, only to be arrested after two years and extradited back to the United States. He manages to avoid prison and retires to Miami, his personal fortune all but gone now that his Cuban casinos have been dismantled by Fidel Castro's regime.

At the climax of the film, Lansky gives an interview to a French journalist. When the journalist asks him what he would do if he could live his life over, Lansky responds, "I wouldn't change a thing."

Cast

 Richard Dreyfuss as Meyer Lansky
 Yosef Carmon as Rabbi
 Mosko Alkalai as Jewelry Shopkeeper
 Fima Noveck as Hasid in Grodno
 Joshua Praw as Meyer Lansky at age 8
 Bernard Hiller as Max Lansky
 Jill Holden as Yetta Lansky
 Larry Moss as Benjamin Lansky
 Chris Marquette as Jake Lansky (age 9-11)
 Ryan Merriman as Meyer Lansky (age 12-14)
 Benjamin Kimball Smith as Benjamin K. Smith
 Anthony Medwetz as Bugsy Siegel (age 11)
 Max Perlich as Meyer Lansky (age 19-28)
 Matthew Settle as Bugsy Siegel (age 17-26)
 Stanley DeSantis as Arnold Rothstein
 Scott Rabinowitz as Zev Ben-Dov
 Bill Capizzi as Joe Masseria
 Ron Gilbert as Salvatore Maranzano
 Nick Corello as Albert Anastasia
 Tom La Grua as Frank Costello
 Sal Landi as Joe Adonis
 Anthony LaPaglia as Lucky Luciano
 Robert Miano as Vito Genovese
 Eric Roberts as Bugsy Siegel
 Peggy Jo Jacobs as Virginia Hill

External links
 
 

1999 television films
1999 films
Biographical films about gangsters
Films about the American Mafia
Films about Jewish-American organized crime
Films directed by John McNaughton
Films scored by George S. Clinton
HBO Films films
1990s English-language films
Cultural depictions of Bugsy Siegel
Cultural depictions of Lucky Luciano
Cultural depictions of Meyer Lansky
Cultural depictions of Salvatore Maranzano
Cultural depictions of Arnold Rothstein
Cultural depictions of Joe Masseria
Cultural depictions of Vito Genovese
Cultural depictions of Joe Adonis
Cultural depictions of Albert Anastasia
American gangster films